The Angry Man of Jazz may refer to:

 Max Miller (jazz musician) (1911–1985), American jazz pianist and vibraphone player, so dubbed by Studs Terkel
 Charles Mingus (1922–1979), American jazz double bassist, composer and bandleader, known for his often fearsome temperament